Lasse Rimmer Nielsen  is a Danish stand-up comedian and television and radio host.

Career
He made his first appearance as a stand-up comedian in 1993 at Café Din's in Copenhagen and participated in DM i Stand-Up (Danish Championship in Stand-up) in the same place in October 1993.

He wrote and took part in DR2's Casper & Mandrilaftalen in 1999 and later hosted the quiz program Jeopardy! for almost four years, from January 2000 to November 2003.

From 18 November 2003 he was co-host of Radio 100FM's morning show Morgenhyrderne, first along with Lars Hjortshøj (since replaced by Simon Jul) and Andrea Elisabeth Rudolph (since replaced by Signe Muusmann), and  still is.

Lasse has been a presenter for events such as the Danish stand-up charity show Talegaver til børn and Studenterlaugets Commerciel Awards 2004.

External links
 

Living people
Danish male comedians
Danish stand-up comedians
Danish radio presenters
People from Aarhus
Year of birth missing (living people)